Andrzejewo  is a village in Ostrów Mazowiecka County, Masovian Voivodeship, in east-central Poland. It is the seat of the gmina (administrative district) called Gmina Andrzejewo.

The village has a population of 1,000.

References

External links
 Jewish Community in Andrzejewo on Virtual Shtetl

Villages in Ostrów Mazowiecka County
Masovian Voivodeship (1526–1795)
Łomża Governorate
Białystok Voivodeship (1919–1939)
Warsaw Voivodeship (1919–1939)
Belastok Region